Live may refer to:

Arts, entertainment, and media

Films
Live! (2007 film), 2007 American film
Live (2014 film), a 2014 Japanese film
Live (Apocalyptica DVD)

Music
Live (band), American alternative rock band
List of albums titled Live

Extended plays
Live EP (Anal Cunt album)
Live EP (Breaking Benjamin EP)
Live (Roxus EP)
Live (The Smithereens EP)CeCe Peniston (EP Live)Ozzy Osbourne Live E.P., 1980Live EP (Live at Fashion Rocks), by David Bowie
Live EP (The Jam EP)

Songs
"Live" (Russian song)
"Live" (Superfly song)
"Live" (The Merry-Go-Round song)

Radio
BBC Radio 5 Live
CILV-FM, branded LiVE 88.5, a radio station in Ottawa, Canada

Television
Live (South Korean TV series), a 2018 South Korean television series
Live (Danish TV series)
Live! (TV channel), ItalyLive! with Kelly'', US TV talk show

Types of media
Live action (cinematography), a motion picture not produced using animation
Live art
Live music, a concert
Live album, recording of a live music concert
Live radio, radio broadcast without delay
Live television, as events happen, not recorded
Live streaming, Internet broadcasting in real time

Information and communication technologies
.live, a top-level Internet domain
Live CD, an operating system bootable from CD
Live coding, on-the-fly computer programming
Live Search, search engine
Live Universal Awareness Map, online mapping of activities
Live USB, an operating system bootable from a USB flash drive

Other uses
Edel Live, a South Korean single-plane paraglider
Live fire exercise, using real ammunition
Live! Casino & Hotel Philadelphia, a casino hotel in Philadelphia

See also
Alive (disambiguation)
Live birth (disambiguation)
Life (disambiguation)
Lives (disambiguation)
Living (disambiguation)